Lasić is a surname. Notable people with the surname include:
Ana Lasić (born 1972), Slovenian screenwriter and playwright
Davor Lasić (born 1966), Croatian footballer
Frano Lasić (born 1954), Croatian actor and singer
Maja Lasić (born 1979), Yugoslavian-born German politician

Croatian surnames